Fepulea’i Afa Ripley Jr. is a former Attorney General of American Samoa. Governor Togiola Tulafono appointed him to succeed Malaetasi Togafau, who died on March 9, 2007, and he was approved by the Fono, or legislature. Ripley is an alumnus of California Western School of Law, and was chairman of the board of the American Samoa Power Authority prior to his appointment.

References

Year of birth missing (living people)
Living people
American lawyers
American Samoan Attorneys General
California Western School of Law alumni